Grauman's Chinese Theatre (branded as TCL Chinese Theatre for naming rights reasons) is a movie palace on the historic Hollywood Walk of Fame at 6925 Hollywood Boulevard in Hollywood, Los Angeles, California, United States.

The original Chinese Theatre was commissioned following the success of the nearby Grauman's Egyptian Theatre, which opened in 1922. Both are in Exotic Revival style architecture. Built by a partnership headed by Sid Grauman over 18 months beginning in January 1926, the theater opened May 18, 1927, with the premiere of Cecil B. DeMille's The King of Kings. It has since been home to many premieres, including the 1977 launch of George Lucas' Star Wars, as well as birthday parties, corporate junkets, and three Academy Awards ceremonies. Among the theater's features are the concrete blocks set in the forecourt, which bear the signatures, footprints, and handprints of popular motion picture personalities from the 1920s to the present day.

Originally named Grauman's Chinese Theatre, it was renamed Mann's Chinese Theatre in 1973; the name lasted until 2001, after which it reverted to its original name. On January 11, 2013, Chinese electronics manufacturer TCL Corporation purchased the facility's naming rights.

In 2013, the Chinese Theatre partnered with IMAX Corporation to convert the house into a custom-designed IMAX theater. The newly renovated theater seats 932 people and features one of the largest movie screens in North America.

History
After his success with the Egyptian Theatre, Sid Grauman turned to Charles E. Toberman to secure a long-term lease from Francis X. Bushman on property at 6925 Hollywood Boulevard, the site of Bushman's mansion. In appreciation, a plaque was installed on the front of the theater dedicating it to Bushman.

Toberman contracted Meyer & Holler, designer of the Egyptian, to design a "palace-type theatre" of Chinese design. Grauman financed the theater's $2.1 million cost and owned a one-third interest in the Chinese Theatre. Grauman's partners, Mary Pickford, Douglas Fairbanks, and Howard Schenck, owned the remainder. The principal architect was Raymond M. Kennedy of Meyer & Holler.

During construction, Grauman hired Jean Klossner to formulate an extremely hard concrete for the forecourt of the theater. Klossner later became known as "Mr. Footprint", performing the footprint ceremonies from 1927 through 1957.

Many stories exist to explain the origins of the footprints. The theater's official account credits Norma Talmadge as having inspired the tradition when she accidentally stepped into the wet concrete. However, in a short interview during the September 13, 1937, Lux Radio Theatre broadcast of a radio adaptation of A Star Is Born, Grauman related another version of how he got the idea to put hand and foot prints in the concrete. He said it was "pure accident. I walked right into it. While we were building the theatre, I accidentally happened to step in some soft concrete. And there it was. So, I went to Mary Pickford immediately. Mary put her foot into it."

In 1947's Fun and Fancy Free "Mickey and the Beanstalk", the cartoon ends with Willie the Giant stomping through Hollywood looking for Mickey Mouse. After he looked for Mickey in one of the buildings and found he was not in there, his right foot stepped over the theater called the "Grauman's Chinese", before he searched the restaurant "Brown Derby" with HOLLYWOOD lights blinking in the background.

Another account, says that the original "accidental" slabs were made and stayed, at the curb, on the sidewalk, until 1958, when they were removed for the Hollywood Walk of Fame.

When they stepped up off the curb, they accidentally walked on wet cement and left a trail of footprints from the street to the front doors of the theater ... The stars, seeing what they had done, grabbed a nail on the ground and signed their names next to their footprints, Pickford even dated it." — Marc Wanamaker, Hollywood Heritage Museum.

Still another account by Klossner recounts that Klossner autographed his work next to the right-hand poster kiosk and that Grauman and he developed the idea then and there. His autograph and handprint, dated 1927, remain today. (Note: In 1949, Klossner's story changed to say that Grauman had accidentally stepped into the wet concrete.) The theater's third founding partner, Douglas Fairbanks, was the second celebrity after Talmadge to be immortalized in the concrete.

In 1929, Grauman decided to retire and sell his share to William Fox's Fox Theatres chain. However, just a few months later, Howard Hughes convinced Grauman to return to the theater, because he wanted Grauman to produce the world premiere of his aviation epic Hell's Angels, which would also feature one of Grauman's theatrical prologs before the film. Grauman remained as the theater's managing director for the entire run of Hell's Angels, retiring once again after its run finished. Unsatisfied with retirement, though, Grauman returned to the theater as managing director on Christmas Day 1931 and kept that position until his death in 1950.

One of the highlights of the Chinese Theatre has always been its grandeur and décor. In 1952, John Tartaglia, the artist of nearby Saint Sophia Cathedral, became the head interior decorator of the Chinese Theatre, as well as the theater chain then owned by Fox West Coast Theatres. He later continued the work of Klossner, by recommendation of J. Walter Bantau, for the Hollywood footprint ceremonies.

Tartaglia performed his first ceremony as what the City of Los Angeles termed "Hollywood's Master Mason" for Jean Simmons in 1953, for the premiere of The Robe, the first premiere in Cinemascope. Although replacing Klossner was initially thought to be a temporary job for Tartaglia, his dedication resulted in a 35-year career in which he last performed as the master mason/concrete artist in honor of Eddie Murphy in May 1987. Tartaglia was formally recognized by the City of Los Angeles in October 2011.

The Chinese Theatre was declared a historic and cultural landmark in 1968, and has undergone restoration projects in the years since then. Ted Mann, owner of the Mann Theatres chain and husband of actress Rhonda Fleming, purchased it in 1973. From then until 2001, it was known as Mann's Chinese Theatre. Mann Theatres grew to become the largest independent chain in the country before Mann sold the business, including the Chinese Theatre, to Gulf+Western in 1986.

In 1988, Time Warner predecessor Warner Communications Inc. bought a 50% stake from Gulf+Western for $150 million. The theater chain was eventually sold to WestStar Holdings in 1997. In 2000, a partnership of Warner Bros. and Paramount Pictures acquired the theater, along with the other Mann Theatres properties.

In 2000, Behr Browers Architects, a firm previously engaged by Mann Theatres, prepared a restoration and modernization program for the structure. The program included a seismic upgrade, new state-of-the-art sound and projection, new vending kiosks, and exterior signage, and the addition of a larger concession area under the balcony. The program began in 2002 and restored the original name — "Grauman's Chinese Theatre" — to the cinema palace. As part of the upgrade, Behr Browers also designed a new Chinese-themed six-plex in the attached Hollywood and Highland shopping center that continued to operate under the name Mann's Chinese 6 Theatre.

In 2007, the CIM Group purchased the land on which the theater sits for an undisclosed price from the Damon Runyon Cancer Research Foundation of New York and Barlow Respiratory Hospital of Los Angeles. CIM Group also owns the Hollywood and Highland shopping center, as well as numerous other residential and commercial properties in Hollywood. On May 27, 2011, Chinese Theatres LLC, a partnership owned by producer Elie Samaha and Donald Kushner, purchased both Grauman's Chinese Theatre and the adjacent Mann Chinese 6.

The exterior of the theater is meant to resemble a giant red Chinese pagoda. The design features a Chinese dragon across the façade, with two authentic Ming Dynasty guardian lions guarding the main entrance and the silhouettes of tiny dragons along the sides of the copper roof. The idea was to give viewers a sense of China, about which most Americans knew very little. The freestanding ticket booth installed in the 1930s and the left and right neon marquees have been removed, restoring the theater to its original appearance. The auditorium has been completely restored, along with much of the exterior; however, wear and tear on the physical structure over the years has caused some of the external décor to be removed.

The Chinese Theatre hosted the 1944, 1945, and 1946 Academy Awards ceremonies; they are now held at the adjacent Dolby Theatre, formerly known as the Kodak Theatre.

Grauman's Chinese Theatre continues to serve the public as a first-run movie theater.

Features
The Chinese Theatre was the first commercial movie theater to have air conditioning. The vents are concealed behind the imported decorative pillars on the side walls of the auditorium.

A concession stand was not in the theater's original plans, because Grauman thought it would detract from the "theatrical experience". The theater began to sell concessions in the 1930s.

Celebrities contributed to the theater's decor. Xavier Cugat painted the trees and foliage between the pillars on the side walls. Keye Luke painted the Chinese murals in the lobby.
A 3-manual 17-rank Wurlitzer organ was installed. Its pipes were above the proscenium with tone chutes directing the sound through holes in the ceiling.

Handprints

 
Nearly 200 Hollywood celebrity handprints, footprints, and autographs are in the concrete of the theater's forecourt. Fairbanks and Pickford were the first, done on April 30, 1927.

Variations of this honored tradition are imprints of Harold Lloyd's eyeglasses, Groucho Marx's cigar, Whoopi Goldberg's dreadlock, the wands used by Harry Potter stars Daniel Radcliffe, Rupert Grint, and Emma Watson, John Barrymore's facial profile (reflecting his nickname "The Great Profile"), Betty Grable's legs, and Marilyn Monroe's earring.

Western stars William S. Hart and Roy Rogers left imprints of their guns. John Wayne left his boot prints and fist prints, Herbie, a Volkswagen Beetle, left the imprints of his tires. The hoofprints of Tom Mix's horse, "Tony", Gene Autry's horse, "Champion", and Rogers' horse, "Trigger", were left in the concrete beside the prints of their owners.

Since 2011, a surge of concrete ceremonies has occurred, many of which have been paid for by movie studios for publicity reasons. One of the theater's current owners, Donald Kushner, acknowledged this and referred to them as mock ceremonies. This influx has been a matter of concern for film buffs and historians, as well as misleading for fans. However, despite the increase of concrete blocks, the ones placed within the forecourt are still chosen by a special committee which selects celebrities based on their contributions to Hollywood cinema. Practice blocks, completed inside the theater before the ceremony, are placed on the walls of the Chinese 6 Theatre lobby, which is also used as an event space.

IMAX conversion
In April 2013, owners announced plans to convert the original theater for IMAX. The new  silver screen is curved and can be masked for premieres and screening events of non-IMAX films. To accommodate better sightlines and a taller screen, seating was re-arranged in stepped rows, descending from street level to the floor of the former basement.

The auditorium's decorative walls and ceiling remain unaltered, the existing curtain was extended, decorative lighting effects were added and TCL added digital signage. The theater reopened on September 20, 2013, with the IMAX 3D version of The Wizard of Oz. Although it opened with only a digital projection system, a 70 mm projection system was added for Interstellar.

In April 2015, the IMAX system was upgraded to use the new dual-4K IMAX with Laser projector system for the premiere of Furious 7.

Recreations
A full-scale recreation of the Chinese Theatre's exterior facade and lobby exists at Disney's Hollywood Studios theme park at the Walt Disney World Resort in Bay Lake, Florida.  The recreation originally housed The Great Movie Ride which opened with the park on May 1, 1989, and closed on August 13, 2017. Its replacement attraction, Mickey & Minnie's Runaway Railway, opened on March 4, 2020. It also has concrete handprints inside the sidewalks from the years 1988–1995.

A sized-down recreation of the Chinese Theatre, both interior and exterior was built at Parque Warner Madrid theme park in San Martín de la Vega, near Madrid, Spain. The building shows films relevant to Warner Bros., previously The Lego Movie and Storks. During Halloween, horror films for guests over the age of 18 are shown such as Friday the 13th.

See also

 List of Grauman's Chinese Theatre handprint ceremonies
 Los Angeles Historic-Cultural Monuments in Hollywood

References

External links

 
 
 Grauman's Chinese Theater "Trader Horn" program, MSS 2383 at L. Tom Perry Special Collections, Brigham Young University
 Map and list of forecourt handprints at TCL Chinese Theatre
 Grauman's Chinese Theatre Imprints at Classic Movie Hub
 handprint & footprint Map
 

1927 establishments in California
Chinese-American history
Chinese design
Cinemas and movie theaters in Hollywood, Los Angeles
Event venues established in 1927
Theatres completed in 1927
Revival architecture in the United States
Hollywood Boulevard
Los Angeles Historic-Cultural Monuments
Movie palaces
Theatre companies in Los Angeles
Walks of fame